UFC Fight Night: Bigfoot vs. Mir (also known as UFC Fight Night 61) was a mixed martial arts event held on February 22, 2015, at the Ginásio Gigantinho in Porto Alegre, Brazil.

Background
The event was the first that the UFC has hosted in the state of Rio Grande do Sul.

A light heavyweight bout between Rashad Evans and Glover Teixeira was expected to serve as the event headliner. However, on January 7, Teixeira was forced out of the bout as his knee, injured in his last fight, was slow to heal and he was unable to resume the proper training to prepare for the fight in that time frame. Evans is expected to be rebooked at a different event with possibly a new opponent.

A heavyweight bout between Antônio Silva and former UFC Heavyweight champion Frank Mir, previously scheduled for UFC 184, a week later, headlined the event.

A welterweight bout between Wendell Oliveira and TJ Waldburger, slated for the televised preliminary portion of the event, was cancelled on the day of the weigh-ins, after Waldburger passed out while cutting weight. Both fighters were paid their show money.

According to Nielsen, the main card broadcast on Fox Sports 1 drew an average 1.21 million US viewers, 35% higher than the network's average Fight Night. The prelims drew 831,000. Viewership peaked at 1.392 million during the Saenz vs Alcântara fight.

The event saw a record 10 of 11 underdogs win, following the first bout. This cost online gambling site Bovada nearly $1 million, including a $48,291 payout on a $1 parlay. Bovada sportsbook manager Kevin Bradley said this would make it hard to have a profitable 2015 in the combat sport market.

Results

Bonus awards
The following fighters were awarded $50,000 bonuses:
Fight of the Night: None awarded
Performance of the Night: Frank Mir, Sam Alvey, Marion Reneau and Matt Dwyer

See also
List of UFC events
2015 in UFC

References

UFC Fight Night
Mixed martial arts in Brazil
2015 in mixed martial arts
Sports in Porto Alegre
2015 in Brazilian sport
February 2015 sports events in South America